Template system may refer to:
 Template processor, software designed to combine templates with a data model to produce result documents
Web template system, a system that allows web designers and developers work with web templates to automatically generate custom web pages